The Taschachwand is a mountain in the Weisskamm group of the Ötztal Alps best known for its north face. In combination with the north faces of the Petersenspitze and the Hinterer Brochkogel it forms the challenging Ötztaler Eisexpress route to the Wildspitze.

External links
 Taschachwand at Summitpost

Mountains of Tyrol (state)
Mountains of the Alps
Alpine three-thousanders
Ötztal Alps